"Low Life" is a song by American rapper Future, featuring Canadian singer the Weeknd. It was released on March 1, 2016, as the lead single from Future's fourth studio album, Evol (2016). The song was written by Future, the Weeknd, Metro Boomin, Ben Billions, & DaHeala, and produced by the latter four.

Release
On December 24, 2015, Future and the Weeknd tweeted that they would release a new song. On the same day, Future posted a short snippet of the song on his Instagram. On December 25, "Low Life" was uploaded on the Weeknd's SoundCloud account. On February 4, 2016, Future announced that would soon release his fourth studio album, EVOL. He published the album's 11-song track list, which included "Low Life". Future released EVOL on February 6.

Commercial performance
"Low Life" debuted at number 52 on the Billboard Hot 100 for the week of February 27, 2016. Its chart debut was supported by first-week sales of 60,588 copies. As of April 23, 2016, the single has sold 247,300 copies in the US. The single is certified eight-times Platinum by the Recording Industry Association of America (RIAA).

Music video
The song's accompanying music video premiered on March 25, 2016, on Future's Vevo account on YouTube. French Montana and Belly make cameo appearances in the video. As of January 2022, it has over 700 million views.

Charts

Weekly charts

Year-end charts

Certifications

Release history

References

External links

2015 songs
2016 singles
Future (rapper) songs
The Weeknd songs
Songs written by Future (rapper)
Songs written by the Weeknd
Songs written by Metro Boomin
Song recordings produced by Metro Boomin
Songs written by DaHeala
Songs written by Ben Billions
Song recordings produced by the Weeknd
Epic Records singles